KM Mathew (1934-2012), popularly known by his  pen  name Ekalavyan, was an Indian writer who wrote in Malayalam. He has shown the army life to the common man through his novels. Born in Kunnamkulam, in Thrissur district, he started his career in Indian Army in 1953 as a soldier. He fought in the Indo-Pakistani War of 1965. Three years later, he published his first short story "Rundu Logam Oru Jeevitham" in Mathrubhumi Weekly

He served in the military for 28 years. He then spent 10 years doing civil work in a military office. In his lifetime, he wrote 33 novels, three short stories and screenplay for a television serial. He is survived by his wife Leelamani and sons Salil Mathew and Dr. Sunil Mathews.

Novels and short stories 

 Randu Lokam Oru Jeevitham
 Kallu
 Daaham
 Shivajikkunnukal
 Trench
 Kayam
 Sarppavisham
 Chakravyooham
 Anali
 Neerali
 Darppanam
 Praharam
 Mounanombarangal
 Karmaantham
 Mrigathrishna
 Greeshmavarshangal
 Pingamikal
 Chora Chinthiyavar
 Aarum Swanthamalla
 Aparna
 Papathinte Shambalam
 Kadankathayile Kathapathrangal
 Charithram Urangunna Peetabhoomi
 Kudumbathinte Manam
 Daivathinte Bhandaram
 Prathibimbangal
 Sandhya
 Ayanam
 Parakkan Mohichavar
 Chirakatta Paravakal
 Ravukal Illatha Rappadikal
 Chuzhikal
 Yudha Bhoomi
 Ente Vazhi
 Kamini Priya Kamini
 Kadalasu Pookkal
 Chanchala
 Enthu Nedi
 Sundarimare Sookshikkuka
 Panam
 Orittu Snehathinai 
 Jeevithathinte Mukhangal

Movie Names 

Manassa Vacha Karmmana
Ayanam
Kanchanam
Swayamvaram (Television Serial)

References

Indian male novelists
Malayalam novelists
Malayalam-language writers
Writers from Thrissur
Novelists from Kerala
1934 births
2012 deaths
20th-century Indian novelists
20th-century Indian short story writers
Indian male short story writers
20th-century Indian male writers